Kaviz-e Olya (also Romanized as Kavīz-e ‘Olyā; also known as Kāūz Bāla, Kavīr-e Bālā, Kavīz, Kavīz-e Bālā, and Kū’īz) is a village in Mardehek Rural District, Jebalbarez-e Jonubi District, Anbarabad County, Kerman Province, Iran. At the 2006 census, its population was 258, in 59 families.

References 

Populated places in Anbarabad County